Brian Martin may refer to:

 Brian Martin (basketball) (born 1962), U.S. basketball player
 Brian Martin (footballer, born 1963), Scottish footballer (Motherwell FC, national team)
 Brian Martín (footballer, born 1996), Spanish footballer 
 Brian Martin (luger) (born 1974), American luger
 Brian Martin (social scientist) (born 1947), professor at the University of Wollongong in Australia
 Brian Frank Martin (born 1936), Chief Justice of the Supreme Court of the Northern Territory, Australia, 1993–2003
 Brian Ross Martin (born 1947), Chief Justice of the Supreme Court of the Northern Territory, Australia, 2004–2010
 Brian J. Martin, American political figure who served as Mayor and City Manager of Lowell, Massachusetts

See also
 Bryan Martyn (1930–2002), Australian rules footballer